Vinicius Rodolfo de Souza Oliveira (born 27 March 1995), known as Vinicius Tanque, is a Brazilian footballer who plays as a forward for Spanish club CD Atlético Baleares, on loan from FC Cartagena.

Career statistics

Club

Notes

References

External links

1995 births
Living people
Brazilian footballers
Association football forwards
Campeonato Brasileiro Série A players
Campeonato Brasileiro Série B players
Botafogo de Futebol e Regatas players
Volta Redonda FC players
Atlético Clube Goianiense players
Liga Portugal 2 players
C.D. Mafra players
Segunda División B players
FC Cartagena footballers
CD Atlético Baleares footballers
Brazilian expatriate footballers
Brazilian expatriate sportspeople in Portugal
Brazilian expatriate sportspeople in Spain
Expatriate footballers in Portugal
Expatriate footballers in Spain
Footballers from Rio de Janeiro (city)